Patrick Anthony Ludden (February 4, 1836 – August 6, 1912) was an Irish-born prelate of the Roman Catholic Church. He served as the first bishop of the new Diocese of Syracuse in New York from 1887 until his death in 1912.

Biography

Early life 
Patrick Ludden was born on February 4, 1836, in Breaffy, near Castlebar, County Mayo, in Ireland to Anthony and Ellen (née Fitzgerald) Ludden. He graduated from St. Jarlath's College in Tuam, Ireland in 1861.  Ludden then went to Canada to enter the Grand Seminary of Montreal in Montreal, Quebec. 

After completing his theological studies, Ludden was ordained to the priesthood in Montreal for the Diocese of Albany by Bishop Ignace Bourget on May 21, 1864. After his ordination, Ludden went to the United States, where he first served as rector of St. Joseph's Church in Malone, New York. He served as secretary to Bishop John McCloskey. He was later named chancellor of the diocese, and accompanied Bishop John J. Conroy as his theologian to the First Vatican Council in Rome. In 1872, Ludden became rector of the Cathedral of the Immaculate Conception in Albany, New York, and vicar general of the diocese. He was named rector of St. Peter's Church in Troy, New York, in 1880.

Bishop of Syracuse 
On December 14, 1886, Ludden was appointed the first bishop of the newly erected Diocese of Syracuse by Pope Leo XIII. He received his episcopal consecration on May 1, 1887, from Archbishop Michael Corrigan, with Bishops Bernard McQuaid and Francis McNeirny serving as co-consecrators. During his 25-year-long tenure, he presided over a period of great growth in the young diocese. 

At the time of Ludden's arrival, the diocese contained 70,000 Catholics, 74 priests, 46 parishes, 20 mission churches, and 16 parochial schools. By the time of his death, there were over 150,000 Catholics, 129 priests, 80 parishes, 36 mission churches, and 21 parochial schools. He selected St. Mary's Church in Syracuse as his new cathedral in 1903, and dedicated it in September 1910. In 1911, Ludden gained a degree of notoriety when he declared that the deadlock in the New York Legislature over the election of William F. Sheehan to the United States Senate was due to anti-Catholicism. Sheehan was later defeated.

Bishop Ludden donated an altar to the Church of Our Lady of the Rosary, Castlebar, Co. Mayo.

Death and legacy 
Patrick Ludden died at his residence in Syracuse, New York on August 12, 1912 at age 74. He is buried in the crypt of the Cathedral of the Immaculate Conception in Syracuse. Bishop Ludden Junior/Senior High School in Syracuse is named after him.

References

External links

1836 births
1912 deaths
20th-century Roman Catholic bishops in the United States
Irish expatriate Catholic bishops
Irish emigrants to the United States (before 1923)
People educated at St Jarlath's College
Religious leaders from County Mayo
19th-century Roman Catholic bishops in the United States
Roman Catholic bishops of Syracuse